N. R. Alagaraja is an Indian politician and was a Member of the Legislative Assembly.

Career  
Alagaraja was elected to the Tamil Nadu legislative assembly as a Tamil Maanila Congress (Moopanar) (TMC) candidate from Theni constituency in the 1996 elections. He had been runner-up as a candidate of the Indian National Congress in the same constituency in 1989.

References 

Indian National Congress politicians from Tamil Nadu
Living people
Tamil Maanila Congress politicians
Tamil Nadu MLAs 1996–2001
Year of birth missing (living people)